is a Japanese judoka. He won the gold medal in the half-lightweight (66 kg) division at the 2010 World Judo Championships.

External links
 

1990 births
Living people
Japanese male judoka
Asian Games medalists in judo
Judoka at the 2010 Asian Games
Medalists at the 2010 Asian Games
Asian Games bronze medalists for Japan
Sportspeople from Ishikawa Prefecture
20th-century Japanese people
21st-century Japanese people